Jochen Urban (born  23 September 1983, in Krefeld) is a German rower. He competed at the 2004 and the 2008 Summer Olympics. Urban is married to swimmer Anne Poleska.

External links
 

1983 births
Living people
Sportspeople from Krefeld
Olympic rowers of Germany
Rowers at the 2004 Summer Olympics
Rowers at the 2008 Summer Olympics
World Rowing Championships medalists for Germany
German male rowers